Automeris metzli is a moth of the family Saturniidae. It is found from Mexico to Venezuela, Colombia and Ecuador and can also be found in Trinidad

The larvae feed on Quercus species.

External links
saturniidae-breeder.de
Moths of Belize

Hemileucinae
Moths described in 1853
Moths of North America
Moths of South America